Commercial Gazette may refer to:

Commercial Gazette, a newspaper that preceded the Cincinnati Commercial Tribune
Commercial Gazette, a newspaper that preceded the Pittsburgh Post-Gazette